Saint-Leu-la-Forêt is a railway station located in the commune of Saint-Leu-la-Forêt (Val-d'Oise department), France. The station is served by Transilien H trains, on the line from Paris to Persan-Beaumont via Saint-Leu-la-Forêt. The daily number of passengers was between 2,500 and 7,500 in 2002.  The station has 2 free parking lots with 118 and 168 places. Saint-Leu-la-Forêt is located on the line from Ermont-Eaubonne to Valmondois, that was opened in 1876. The line was electrified in 1970.

Bus connections

Valoise: 30.14 and 30.23

See also
List of SNCF stations in Île-de-France

References

External links

 

Railway stations in Val-d'Oise